George Weinberg (1901 – January 29, 1939) was a New York mobster and, with brother Abraham Weinberg, an associate of Dutch Schultz as a mob accountant during the 1920s and 1930s. In 1935, following the disappearance of his brother and the gangland murder of Schultz, he decided to become a government informant and testified against his former associates.

However, while under police protection in a safehouse in White Plains, New York, he stole a gun from one of the detectives guarding him and committed suicide on January 29, 1939.

References

External links 
 

1901 births
1939 suicides
American accountants
Jewish American gangsters
Suicides by firearm in New York (state)
20th-century American Jews